All My Heroes Are Dead is the third studio album from New York City hip hop artist R.A. the Rugged Man. The album was released on April 17, 2020, by Nature Sounds. It is the follow-up to 2013's Legends Never Die. The album features guest appearances from Ghostface Killah, Inspectah Deck, Kool G Rap, Ice-T, Chuck D, Timbo King, Atmosphere, Vinnie Paz, Eamon, Onyx, M.O.P., and Brand Nubian. The album's production was handled by Prince Paul, Psycho Les, Mr. Green and Classified, among others.

Background
Following the success of Legends Never Die, R.A. the Rugged Man announced he would begin working on a follow-up project. The first single from the album, "Legendary Loser", produced by Psycho Les of The Beatnuts, was released on January 15, 2020, alongside visuals and confirmation of the project title. On April 13, 2020, an official trailer was released for the album. The visual promotion, produced by Thorburn, was created as an homage to various B movie action films of the 1980s.

Reception

HipHop Golden Age called All My Heroes Are Dead the best album of the year so far, and called "Slayer Club" off the album the best posse cut of the year. HipHop Dx called All My Heroes Are Dead one of the best albums of 2020.

Track listing

Chart performance
The album debuted at number 7 on the US Billboard Heatseekers Albums, reached number 22 on the Billboard Top Current Album Sales chart and peaked at number 9 on the Billboard Top Canadian Album Sales chart. The album debuted at number 3 on the UK R&B chart.

Charts

References

2020 albums
R.A. the Rugged Man albums
Nature Sounds albums
Albums produced by Prince Paul (producer)